Summit Lake is a lake in the Unorganized North Part of Algoma District, Ontario, Canada. The lake is in the Michipicoten River system in the Lake Superior drainage basin, and is the source of the Lochalsh River. There are no primary inflows, and the primary outflow is the Lochalsh River, north towards St. Julien Lake, which flows into Dog Lake and then via the Michipicoten River into Lake Superior.

See also
List of lakes in Ontario

References

Lakes of Algoma District